Jack Marvin Hollander (April 13, 1927 – November 10, 2019) was an American nuclear physicist. He held various positions in nuclear physics, energy, environmental research, and academic administration throughout his career. He was also the founding editor of the academic journal the Annual Review of Energy (now the Annual Review of Environment and Resources).

Early life and education
Jack M. Hollander was born into a family of Eastern European Jewish immigrants on April 13, 1927 in Youngstown, Ohio. He was born to parents Adele  Feuer and Isadore Hollander, and had two older siblings, Maurice (born 1922) and Louise (born 1924). Isadore Hollander had immigrated from Hungary as a young child, and Adele Feuer had immigrated from Romania as a teenager; they met at a social at a Jewish center. Isadore was an accountant, and Adele was a volunteer nurse during World War I. Jack Hollander attended Ohio State University, graduating with a bachelor's degree in chemistry in 1948. He then attended the University of California, Berkeley, graduating with a PhD in nuclear chemistry in 1951.

Career
In 1968, Hollander was one of the cofounders of the environmental research program at Lawrence Berkeley Laboratory. From 1973–1976, he was the first director of the lab's Energy and Environment Division. In 1980, he was a cofounder of the American Council for an Energy-Efficient Economy. From 1979–1983, he was the first director of the University of California Energy Institute. He was the chairperson of the Beijer Institute of Energy and Human Ecology from 1976 to 1988. He worked at Ohio State University as vice president for research and graduate studies from 1983–1989. He was the founding editor of the peer-reviewed journal the Annual Review of Energy, which was first published in 1976. He remained the editor until 1992.

Awards and honors
Hollander received two Guggenheim Fellowships, both in the natural sciences category and the field of physics. The first was in 1958 and the second was in 1965. He was elected a fellow of American Association for the Advancement of Science in 1980 and the American Physical Society in 1987 "for founding and directing research programs on energy and the environment and for taking a leading role in the study of global energy resources and requirements".

Personal life and death
Hollander's first wife was Margie Schnarr Hollander, with whom he had three children. He later married pianist Sharon Mann, the mother of his two stepchildren, on December 31, 1985. He died on November 10, 2019 in Berkeley, California at the age of 92.

References

1927 births
2019 deaths
People from Youngstown, Ohio
American people of Hungarian-Jewish descent
American people of Romanian-Jewish descent
Ohio State University College of Arts and Sciences alumni
University of California, Berkeley alumni
Fellows of the American Physical Society
Fellows of the American Association for the Advancement of Science
Annual Reviews (publisher) editors